František Uprka (8 September 1868, in Kněždub – 26 January 1929, in Tuchoměřice) was a Czech sculptor, the younger brother of folklife painter Joža Uprka. He was usually called by his nickname, Franta.

Life and work
He was one of four children born to Ján Uprka, a farmer, and his wife Eva née Machálková, from Lipov. His father was also an amateur painter, which inspired him and his brother, Joža, to pursue careers in art. Those plans were interrupted by their father's early death, in 1874, after which their mother insisted on more practical career choices, such as teaching or the clergy. As a result, František was sent to the Piarist grammar school in Strážnice, but he performed poorly there and returned to help on the farm.

Later, he was able to follow his artistic inclinations; taking classes in woodcarving at a school in Valašské Meziříčí. He never finished his courses there, choosing instead to go to Prague, where he planned to study clay modelling at the Academy of Fine Arts with Josef Mauder. However, due to his incomplete primary education, he was not accepted at the Academy. He was able to find a position as an assistant in a stone carving firm.

After completing his military service, in 1892, he made a study trip to several Czech and German cities; paying visits to schools that taught sculpture. He became a member of the Mánes Union of Fine Arts and, after 1903, began to exhibit with them. In 1906, he had a showing in Milan, followed by exhibits in Venice and Rome. 

In 1918, the famous  reopened, after a seven year hiatus, with an exhibition featuring his works and those of Alois Kalvoda. In 1920 his statue, "Pilgrims", was presented at the Salon in Paris, as an example of Czech art. During the 1920s, he often stayed in Slovakia, where he created decorations for the poublic buildings in Bratislava. His last major work was a monument to František Bohumír Zvěřina, in Hrotovice.

In 1928, he was stricken by appendicitis and rushed to the hospital for an emergency operation. After that, his health deteriorated. Following another stay in the hospital, he and Otilia went to Tuchoměřice to rest and recuperate. He died there, of a heart attack, in 1929.

Sources
 Jaroslav Kačer (Ed.): Franta Úprka: 1868–1929 (exhibition catalog), Galerie výtvarného umění v Hodoníně, 2008. 
 Monika Eretová: Sochař Franta Úprka a jeho sepulkrální tvorba, thesis, 2013, Univerzita Karlova v Praze
 František Hoplíček and Oldřich Koblížek (Eds.): Almanach Sdružení výtvarných umělců moravských v Hodoníně, Hodonín 1923.
 Franta Úprka 1868–1929. Posmrtná výstava sochařského díla jeho (exhibition catalog), Hodonín 1930.
 Jan Andrys and Ilona Tunklová (Eds.): Sladké s hořkým. Ze života umělecké družiny Domu umělců SVUM v Hodoníně, Hodonín 2007.

External links

 Biographical notes @ AbART
 Exhibition notes @ the České muzeum výtvarných umění
 Biographical notes @ the České muzeum výtvarných umění
 Biography and appreciation by Václav Rybařík @ Kámen

1868 births
1929 deaths
Czech sculptors
People from Hodonín District